Troy Horne is an American pop/rock musician who has starred in the Broadway show Rent, NBC’s The Sing Off, Star Search and the ION Networks Firebrand TV. He has been featured as a spokesperson and musical guest for personal development giant Nightingale Conant . Additionally, Troy has toured the world with his band Moses alongside Steve Miller (musician) and Gov’t Mule. Troy became a creative leader and band member of the a cappella band known as The House Jacks. He co-founded Colorado School of Acting; Colorado's only trade school for the performing arts Troy is featured on Forbes Magazine and on ESPN's 2011 Monday Night Football musical opener. He's also  profiled on MTV and  ReverbNation,

Music career
Troy Horne takes delight in creating music. In 1998 he founded the Troy Horne band and was later featured in Forbes Magazine with Freedom Zone record label founder and owner Jim Milligan during the Levi's Steve Miller Gov’t Mule Tour. In 2000, Troy's music was featured in the movie All About You (Faith Filmworks) which was written and directed by Christine Swanson and produced by Michael Swanson. The following year Troy created music for the film Thug Angel – A Tupac Shakur Documentary produced by QD3 entertainment. The music has created ongoing appreciation and recognition of his musical work.

Troy is a current member of the House Jacks and has also produced music for coach Tony Dungee's audio version of his book captioned Uncommon in 2009. From 2007 to 2008 Troy was featured in the hit musical Rent as Tom Collins. It was during his time in this production that the idea for a school that teach others how to become professional actors was born. Later in 2009 Troy and his wife Elizabeth Karsell Horne founded Colorado School of Acting, Colorado's first and only state certified vocational school of actors. Later in 2011, Troy Horne was featured in NBC’s The Sing Off (Season 3) in the ground-breaking a cappella hip hop group Urban Method.

Discography
Troy Horne has a catalogue of musical recordings which have been featured on music platforms including IMDb and RiverbNation. The table below chronicles some of the musical contributions included in his discography:

His current album captioned I AM comes with a message of empowerment and personal celebration for the world.

Personal life
Troy Horne married Elizabeth Karsell Horne in 2002. The marriage has produced three children.

See also
 Rock music
 Pop music
 Country rock

References

External links
 

American pop musicians
American rock musicians
Living people
Year of birth missing (living people)